Henricus turbula is a species of moth of the family Tortricidae. It is found in Mexico (Tamaulipas, Chiapas) and Guatemala.

References

Moths described in 1968
Henricus (moth)